Fine is a surname. Notable people with the surname include:

 Alan Fine (executive) (born 1951), American President of Marvel Entertainment
 Alan Fine (writer) (born 1953), American author, executive coach, consultant and speaker
 Anne Fine (born 1947), British author of children's books
 Arthur Fine (born 1937), American philosopher of science
 Asipeli Fine (born 1992), Australian rugby league footballer
 Benjamin Fine (1905–1975), American journalist and author
 Bernie Fine (born 1945), former associate basketball coach at Syracuse University
 Budd Fine (1894–1966), American character actor 
 Burton M. Fine (born 1932), American politician and lawyer
 Cordelia Fine (born 1975), Canadian-born British psychologist and journalist
 Elaine Fine (born 1959), American composer, musician and music teacher
 Gary Alan Fine (born 1950), American sociologist and author
 Henry Burchard Fine (1858–1928), American mathematician and dean
 Irving Fine (1914–1962), American composer
 Jeanna Fine (born 1964), American pornographic actress and exotic dancer
 John Fine (disambiguation)
 Kit Fine (born 1946), British philosopher
 Larry Fine (1902–1975), stage name of American actor and comedian Louis Feinberg, member of the Three Stooges
 Laura Fine (born 1967), American politician
 Larry Fine (pianos) (born 1950), American technician and author
 Lou Fine (1914–1971),  American comic book artist
 Mason Fine (born 1997), American football quarterback
 Morton Fine (1916–1991), American screenwriter and broadcast radio writer
 Nathan Fine (1916–1994), American mathematician
 Oronce Finé (1494–1555), French mathematician and cartographer
 Ralph Adam Fine (1941–2014), American judge
 Reuben Fine (1914–1993), American chess player and psychologist
 Sidney A. Fine (1903–1982), American lawyer, politician and member of the New York State Supreme Court
 Sidney Fine (historian) (1920–2009), American history professor
 Steven Fine (born 1958), historian of Judaism and professor
 Sylvia Fine (1913–1991), American lyricist, composer and producer, wife of comedian and actor Danny Kaye
 Terrence L. Fine, American mathematician and engineering professor
 Tommy Fine (1914–2005), American Major League Baseball pitcher
 Vivian Fine (1913–2000), American composer
 Wilma Cozart Fine (1927–2009), American classical music record producer